Serej is a village in Qareh Naz Rural District, in the Central District of Maragheh County, East Azerbaijan Province, Iran. At the 2006 census, its population was 1,271, in 333 families.

References 

Towns and villages in Maragheh County